Generation Jones is the social cohort of the latter half of the Baby boomer generation to the first year of Generation X. The term Generation Jones was first coined by the American cultural commentator Jonathan Pontell, who identified the cohort as those born from 1954 to 1965 in the U.S., who were children during Watergate, the oil crisis, and stagflation rather than during the 1950s, but slightly before Gen X. 

Unlike "leading-edge boomers", most of Generation Jones did not grow up with World War II veterans as fathers, and, as they reached adulthood, there was no compulsory military service and no defining political cause, as opposition to United States involvement in the Vietnam War was for the older boomers. Their parents' generation was sandwiched between the Greatest Generation and the Baby Boomers. Also, by 1955, a majority of U.S. households had at least one television set, and so unlike Leading-Edge Boomers born from the mid 1940s to the early 1950s, many members of Generation Jones (trailing-edge boomers) have never lived in a world without television—similar to how many members of Generation Z (1997–2012) have never lived in a world without personal computers or the internet, or mobile phones. Generation Jones were children during the sexual revolution of the 1960s and 1970s and were young adults when HIV/AIDS became a worldwide threat in the 1980s.

The name "Generation Jones" has several connotations, including a large anonymous generation, a "keeping up with the Joneses" competitiveness and the slang word "jones" or "jonesing", meaning a yearning or craving. Pontell suggests that Jonesers inherited an optimistic outlook as children in the 1960s, but were then confronted with a different reality as they entered the workforce during Reaganomics and the shift from a manufacturing to a service economy, which ushered in a long period of mass unemployment. Mortgage interest rates increased to above 12 percent in the mid-eighties, making it virtually impossible to buy a house on a single income. De-industrialization arrived in full force in the mid-late 1970s and 1980s; wages would be stagnant for decades, and 401Ks replaced pensions, leaving them with a certain abiding "jonesing" quality for the more prosperous days of the past.

Generation Jones is noted for coming of age after a huge swath of their older brothers and sisters in the earlier portion of the Baby Boomer population had; thus, many note that there was a paucity of resources and privileges available to them that were seemingly abundant to older Boomers. Therefore, there is a certain level of bitterness and "jonesing" for the level of doting and affluence granted to older Boomers but denied to them.

The term has enjoyed some currency in political and cultural commentary, including during the 2008 United States presidential election, where Barack Obama (born 1961) and Sarah Palin (born 1964) were on the presidential tickets.

Cultural, economic, and political dimensions
While charismatic leaders like John F. Kennedy and Martin Luther King Jr. inspired millions of older Boomers to work for — and witness — positive social change, younger Boomers were in preschool or not yet born. The Woodstock pop festival (1969) was a defining moment for older Boomers; younger Boomers have few memories from before the Watergate scandal (1972–1974) and the cultural cynicism it begat. While in high school, members of Generation Jones had a distinct feeling of having just missed the real hippie era.

Many came of age during the 1970s and early 1980s. They shared similar pop culture and MTV with Gen X'ers. They were young adults navigating the workforce in the 1980s and 1990s but still felt the 2008 economic crisis. This hit them hard because they had to help and advise their older Millennial children while also providing for their older Gen Z kids. 

Generation Jones has been covered and discussed in newspapers, magazines, TV, and radio shows. Pontell has appeared on TV networks such as CNN, MSNBC, and BBC, discussing the cultural, political, and economic implications of this generation's emergence.

In the business world, Generation Jones has become a part of the strategic planning of many companies and industries, particularly in the context of targeting Jonesers through marketing efforts. Carat UK, a European media buying agency, has done extensive research into Generation Jones consumers.

Politically, Generation Jones has emerged as a crucial voting segment in US and UK elections. In the U.S. 2006 congressional and 2004 presidential elections, and the 2005 U.K. elections, Generation Jones's electoral role was widely described as pivotal by the media and political pollsters. In the 2008 U.S. Presidential election, Generation Jones was again seen as a key electoral segment because of the high degree to which its members were swing voters during the election cycle. Influential journalists, like Clarence Page and Peter Fenn, singled out Generation Jones voters as crucial in the final weeks of the campaign.
Numerous studies have been done by political pollsters and publications analyzing the voting behavior of Gen Jonesers.  Generation Jones voters are likely to contain the highest proportion of Brexit voters.

The election to the presidency of Barack Obama, born in 1961, plus Republican vice presidential candidate Sarah Palin, born 1964, focused more attention on Generation Jones. Many journalists, publications, and experts – including Jonathan Alter (Newsweek), David Brooks (The New York Times) and Karen Tumulty (Time) – have characterized Obama as a member of Generation Jones.

Key characteristics assigned to members are pessimism, distrust of government, and general cynicism.

In Pontell's opinion, the US cohort shifted left in 2020, which he attributed to Trump’s response to the Covid-19 crisis and Trump’s mocking of Joe Biden’s senior moments. "There are lots of seniors out there that also have senior moments," Pontell says. "They don’t really like the president mocking those one bit."

See also

 List of generations
 Cusper
 Xennials
 Zillennials
 Interbellum Generation

References

External links
 Generation Jones news website

Cultural generations